Dafar-e Olya (also Romanized as Dafār-e ‘Olyā; also known as Dafār) is a village in Bostan Rural District, Bostan District, Dasht-e Azadegan County, Khuzestan Province, Iran. At the 2006 census, its population was 64, in 9 families.

References 

Populated places in Dasht-e Azadegan County